Nocardioides ginsengagri is a Gram-positive, rod-shaped, non-spore-forming and non-motile bacterium from the genus Nocardioides which has been isolated from soil from a ginseng field in Baekdu Mountain, China.

References

External links
Type strain of Nocardioides ginsengagri at BacDive -  the Bacterial Diversity Metadatabase	

ginsengagri
Bacteria described in 2012